Lynn Morris (1954–2017), was an American Christian fiction author.

Lynn Morris may also refer to:

 Lynn Morris (musician) (born 1948), American bluegrass musician 
 Lynn Morris (politician) (born 1949), American politician, member of the Missouri House of Representatives (from 2013)